Alexander Spoehr (August 23, 1913 – June 11, 1992) was an American anthropologist who served as president of the American Anthropological Association in 1965.

Spoehr was born in Tucson, Arizona on August 23, 1913, to parents Herman Augustus Spoehr and Florence Mann. Alexander Spoehr was of German, Danish, and Austrian descent. He was raised in Palo Alto, California, and enrolled at Stanford University, later transferring to the University of Chicago, where he completed an A. B. in economics. Spoehr remained at the University of Chicago for graduate study in anthropology, researching the Seminole in Florida. In January 1940, Spoehr began working at the Field Museum. He served in the U.S. Marine Corps Reserve and the U.S. Army Corps of Engineers during World War II, and later joined the Naval Reserve. Spoehr returned to the Field Museum in 1946. He left Chicago for Honolulu in 1953, and worked for the Bishop Museum until 1962. Spoehr had been named leader of the East–West Center in 1961, and served from 1962 until his resignation in 1963 to teach at the University of Pittsburgh. He left Pitt in 1978, and moved to Hawaii. He died at the age of 78 on June 11, 1992, in Honolulu.

In 2019, a little girl whom he had photographed on Majuro Atoll in the Marshall Islands in 1947 without recording her name was identified by her son while exploring the museum's Pacific Islander cultural collections, an incident that gained some attention in the media.

References

1913 births
1992 deaths
20th-century American anthropologists
American curators
American people of Austrian descent
American people of Danish descent
American people of German descent
People from Honolulu
People from Palo Alto, California
People from Tucson, Arizona
Presidents of the American Anthropological Association
Stanford University alumni
University of Chicago alumni
University of Pittsburgh faculty
People associated with the Field Museum of Natural History